Marcel Toader (4 January 1963 – 3 August 2019) was a Romanian rugby union player and a businessman and media personality. He played as a wing. He was usually considered one of the best Romanian rugby wings of all time.

Club career
He played for Steaua București, from 1983/84 to 1986/87. He won the Romanian Rugby Championship three times in 1983/84, 1984/85 and 1986/87.

International career
Toader gathered 30 caps for Romania, from his debut in 1982 to his last game in 1990. He scored 3 tries during his international career, 12 points on aggregate. He was a member of his national side for the first Rugby World Cup in 1987, scoring two tries during the tournament, against Zimbabwe and Scotland.

Personal life and death
Toader was married to TV presenter Gabriela Cristea and then to singer Maria Constantin. He had one son.

Toader had a history of heart problems and suffered a heart attack in 2012. He died on August 3, 2019, of a heart attack. He was 56.

References

External links

1963 births
2019 deaths
Romanian rugby union players
Rugby union wings
Romania international rugby union players
CSA Steaua București (rugby union) players
People from Constanța County